White Hunter is a 1936 American adventure film directed by Irving Cummings and written by Sam Duncan, Kenneth Earl and Georg Wilhelm Pabst. The film stars Warner Baxter, June Lang, Gail Patrick, Alison Skipworth, Wilfrid Lawson and George Hassell. The film was released on November 25, 1936, by 20th Century Fox.

Plot
Safari guide (Baxter) is hired by the man (Lawson) who was responsible for his father's death.

Cast 
Warner Baxter as Capt. Clark Rutledge
June Lang as Toni Varek
Gail Patrick as Helen Varek
Alison Skipworth as Aunt Frederika
Wilfrid Lawson as Michael Varek
George Hassell as Valentine Ponsonby-Smith
Ernest Whitman as Abdi
Forrester Harvey as Pembrooke
Willie Fung as Wong
Olaf Hytten as Barton
Ralph Cooper as Ali
Will Stanton as Harry

References

External links 
 

1936 films
1930s English-language films
American adventure films
1936 adventure films
20th Century Fox films
Films directed by Irving Cummings
American black-and-white films
Films about hunters
Films scored by Arthur Lange
1930s American films